Alasania is a Georgian surname. Notable people with the surname include:

Giuli Alasania, Georgian historian 
Irakli Alasania, Georgian politician and diplomat
Mamia Alasania, Georgian military commander 

Georgian-language surnames